Jinaharsha was a Jain ascetic poet who lived in 17th and 18th century.

He was a disciple of Shantiharsha of Kharatara Gaccha. He spent last years of his life in Anhilwad Patan where his handwritten manuscripts are  preserved in Jain libraries.

Works
Jinaharsha had written more than thirty Rasas, an early genre of poetry. Some of them are Shukaraja Rasa (1681), Shripalrajano Rasa (1684), Ratnasinh Rajarshi Rasa (1685), Kumarpal Rasa (1686), Harishchandra Rasa (1688), Uttamkumar Charitra Rasa (1689), Abhaykumar Rasa (1702), Sheelvati Rasa (1702), Jambuswami Rasa (1704), Aaramshobha Rasa (1705), Vasudeva Rasa (1706). He also wrote more than four hundred devotional poems in the form of Stavana, Sajjhaya, Hundi, etc. His prose includes three Balavabodha. Majority of his works are unpublished.

See also
 List of Gujarati-language writers

References

People from Patan district
Date of birth unknown
Date of death unknown
Indian male poets
Gujarati-language poets
Indian Jain poets
Indian Jain monks
17th-century Indian Jains
17th-century Jain monks
17th-century Indian monks
17th-century Indian poets
18th-century Indian Jains
18th-century Jain monks
18th-century Indian monks
18th-century Indian poets
18th-century male writers
17th-century male writers
Śvētāmbara monks